Hockey Club Liceo (also known as Deportivo Liceo for sponsorship reasons) is a Spanish rink hockey club based in A Coruña, Spain.

Founded in 1972, Liceo is the only team from outside Catalonia to have won the Spanish league.

History

Founded in 1972 at the school Liceo La Paz, the club achieved the promotion to the first division in only seven years. In the 1980–81 season, only their second at the top tier, the club ended in the third position and secured the qualification to the World Skate Europe Cup.

The 1980s became the golden years of the club. They started in 1982 with the title of the World Skate Europe Cup in their European debut and continued with the first Copa del Rey.

In 1983 Liceo won their first League and later, the club would win two consecutive European Cups in 1987 and 1988. The golden years of the club ended in the 1990s with six national leagues, eight cups and three European Cups.

At the end of the 1990s the club starts a decline of results, winning no titles for several years until the European League of 2003. Years later, the club grew again until it returned to the European elite by winning the European Leagues of 2011 and 2012 and, later, the 2012–13 OK Liga.

In 2016, the women's team would make their debut in the OK Liga Femenina. Liceo promoted also in 2014, but in that time, refused to play in the Spanish women's roller hockey first division.

In 2016 and 2018 the men's team enlarged their list of trophies by winning the Spanish SuperCup.

Season to season

Trophies
OK Liga: 8
1982–83, 1985–86, 1986–87, 1989–90, 1990–91, 1992–93, 2012–13, 2021–22
Copa del Rey: 10
1982, 1984, 1988, 1989, 1991, 1995, 1996, 1997, 2004, 2021
Supercopa de España: 3
2016, 2018, 2021
European League: 6
1987, 1988, 1992, 2003, 2011, 2012
World Skate Europe Cup: 3
1982, 1999, 2010
Cup Winners Cup: 2
1990, 1996
Continental Cup: 6
1987, 1988, 1989, 1992, 2003, 2012
Intercontinental Cup: 5
1987, 1989, 1993, 2004, 2012
Ciudad de Vigo Tournament: 13
1983, 1985, 1986, 1987, 1988, 1989, 1990, 1992, 1993, 1994, 2002, 2005, 2006

Notable players
Alberto Areces
Carlos Gil
Cristiano Pereira
Daniel Martinazzo
Facundo Salinas
Jaume Llaverola
Jordi Bargalló
Mario Agüero
Mario Rubio
Martín Payero
Pablo Álvarez
Ramón Canalda
Reinaldo García
Ricardo Barreiros
Rui Lopes
Willy Duarte

References

External links
 HC Coinasa Liceo Official Website
 

Spanish rink hockey clubs
Sport in A Coruña
Sports clubs established in 1972
Sports teams in Galicia (Spain)
Deportivo de La Coruña